Ronak Patani (born 1993), is a British actor and voice artist of Indian descent. He is best known for the roles in the films Point Break, The Works and Mayfair.

Career
He was raised in London, England and later trained at Royal Central School of Speech and Drama. Then on 2012, he made acting debut with the short film Hannah. In 2014, he worked as a casting assistant for the British film Three Brothers directed by Aleem Khan.

In 2015, he made his international acting debut in the Hollywood remake of Point Break. He was lucky to work opposite top British stars: Ralph Fiennes, Benedict Cumberbatch, Meera Syal, Sharon D Clarke and Sanjeev Bhaskar in his early career. During his acting performance in the play Macbeth at the Royal National Theatre, his friend Rajesh Gopie invited him to play in a South African film titled Mayfair.

In 2018, he appeared in the South African Indian action crime film Mayfair. He played the supportive role of 'estranged son Zaid' in the film, which later received positive reviews. The film was also screened at the 62nd BFI London Film Festival and Africa in Motion Film Festival in October 2018.

Other than acting, he is also a prolific poet where he won the prestigious Roundhouse Poetry Slam, a UK competition for spoken word artists. He performs his poetry throughout the UK, and also produces poetry short films.

Filmography

References

External links
 

Living people
British people of Indian descent
British film actors
British television actors
People from London
1993 births